Events from the year 1942 in art.

Events
 January – Treasures from the new National Gallery of Art in Washington, D.C. are evacuated by train to the Biltmore Estate at Asheville, North Carolina.
February 15 – Singapore surrenders to Japanese forces. Among the British troops captured is illustrator Ronald Searle.
March 28–29 – Bombing of St. Mary's Church, Lübeck, destroys Adriaen Isenbrandt's Bröhmse triptych, Jacob van Utrecht's Trinity Altar, Friedrich Overbeck's Entrance of Christ into Jerusalem and Bernt Notke's Gregorsmesse and replica Totentanz, but reveals medieval frescos.
May 8 – English novelist David Garnett marries painter and writer Angelica Bell, the daughter of painters Duncan Grant (Garnett's lover) and Vanessa Bell.
July 27 – A large amount of "degenerate art" including works by Picasso, Dalí, Ernst, Klee, Léger and Miró is destroyed in a bonfire in the gardens of the Galerie nationale du Jeu de Paume in Nazi-occupied Paris.
October – Michael Ayrton and John Minton exhibit together at the Leicester Galleries in London.
October 14–November 7 – The "First Papers of Surrealism" exhibition, arranged by André Breton and Marcel Duchamp, is held at the Whitelaw Reid Mansion on Madison Avenue in New York City, including Duchamp's His Twine and Breton's Hanging.
October 20 – The Art of This Century gallery is opened by Peggy Guggenheim at 30 West 57th Street in Manhattan, New York City.
unknown dates
 Salvador Dalí publishes his autobiography, The Secret Life of Salvador Dalí.
 Horst Rosenthal, whilst in Gurs internment camp, produces Mickey au Camp de Gurs and two other comic books; on September 11 he is murdered on arrival at Auschwitz concentration camp.

Awards
 Archibald Prize: William Dargie – Corporal Jim Gordon, VC

Works

 Rita Angus – Portrait (Betty Curnow)
 Thomas Hart Benton – Year of Peril (series)
 George Berry – Statue of Benjamin Franklin (sculpture, Franklin High School (Portland, Oregon))
 Pierre Bonnard – Red Roofs in Cannet
 Paul-Émile Borduas – Abstraction No 7
 Russell Drysdale – Soldier
 Richard Eurich
 HMS Revenge Leaving Harbour
 The Raid on the Bruneval Radio-location Station
 Marie Hadad – Portrait of Mr. Dahesh (Dahesh Museum of Art)
 Edward Hopper
 Dawn in Pennsylvania
 Nighthawks
 Dame Laura Knight – A Balloon Site, Coventry
 Helen Levitt - New York City (photograph)
 Jacques Lipchitz – Theseus (sculpture)
 L. S. Lowry
 After the Blitz
 Blitzed Site
 Roberto Matta
 The Apples we Know
 Composition in Magenta: The End of Everything
 The Disasters of Mysticism
 The Hanged Man
 Paul Nash – The Archer
 Frank Newbould – Your Britain, Fight for it Now (poster series)
 Méret Oppenheim – Sun, Moon, Stars
 Gordon Parks – American Gothic, Washington, D.C. (photograph)
 Pablo Picasso
 Portrait of Dora Maar
 Woman in a Fish Hat (Stedelijk Museum, Amsterdam)
 Diego Rivera – The Flower Seller
 Ruskin Spear – We Can Take It
 Dorothea Tanning – Birthday (Philadelphia Museum of Art)
 Carel Weight – Recruit's Progress – Medical Inspection
 Andrew Wyeth – Winter Fields
 Philip Zec – The price of petrol has been increased by one penny – Official (political cartoon)

Births
 January 8 – George Passmore, English artist partnering with Gilbert (Proesch)
 February 2 – Alonzo Davis, African American artist
 February 10 – Lawrence Weiner, American conceptual artist
 February 28 – Oliviero Toscani, Italian photographer
 March 2 – Jonathan Borofsky, American painter, sculptor and installation artist
 March 16 – Danny Lyon, American documentary photographer
 March 20 - Peter Schjeldahl, 80, American art critic (The New Yorker, The New York Times)  (d.2022)
 March 31 – Dan Graham, American conceptual and performance artist  (d.2021)
 May 20 – Anna Maria Maiolino, Italian-born Brazilian artist
 August 18? – Charlotte Johnson Wahl, born Charlotte Fawcett, English painter
 October 6 – Dan Christensen, American abstract painter (d.2007)
 October 29 – Bob Ross, American painter and television presenter (d.1995)
 November 7 – Stan Rice, American poet and artist (d.2002)
 December 1 – William Feaver, English art critic and historian
 date unknown
 Susan Crile, American painter
 David Medalla, Filipino-born sculptor
 De Es Schwertberger, born Dieter Schwertberger, Austrian painter

Deaths
 January – Albert Moulton Foweraker, English painter (b. 1873)
 January 5 – Tina Modotti, Italian photographer and model (b. 1896)
 January 6 – John Bernard Flannagan, American sculptor (b. 1895) (suicide)
 January 22 – Walter Sickert, British Impressionist painter (b. 1860)
 January 23 – Bogdan Šuput, Serbian painter (b. 1914)
 January 27 –  Petar Dobrović, Serbian painter (b. 1890)
 February 9 – Anna Elizabeth Klumpke, American portrait and genre painter (b. 1856)
 February 12 – Grant Wood, American painter (b. 1892)
 February 16 – Giovanni Bartolena, Italian painter (b. 1886)
 February 20 – Herbert Dicksee, English canine painter (b. 1862)
 April 18 - Adolphe Valette, French painter (b. 1876)
 April 18 – Gertrude Vanderbilt Whitney, founder of the Whitney Museum of American Art (b. 1875)
 May 23 – C. R. Ashbee, English designer (b. 1863)
 June 18 – Sutherland Macdonald, English tattoo artist (b. 1860)
 June 30 – William Henry Jackson, American photographer (b. 1843)
 August 10 – Albert Guillaume, French painter and caricaturist (b. 1873)
 August 30 – Sava Šumanović, Serbian painter (b. 1896)
 September 2 – Eric Ravilious, English painter (b. 1903) (lost on active service as a war artist)
 September 7
 Cecilia Beaux, American portrait painter (b. 1855)
 Albert Julius Olsson, English marine painter (b. 1864)
 November 24 – Bohumil Kafka, Czech sculptor (b. 1878)
 December 19 – T. F. Šimon, Czech painter (b. 1877)
 date unknown
 Nampeyo, Hopi ceramicist (b. 1860)

See also
 1942 in fine arts of the Soviet Union

References

 
Years of the 20th century in art
1940s in art